Sri Aji Kresna Kepakisan was a king of Bali who governed the island under the suzerainty of the Javanese Majapahit Empire (1293-c. 1527). He is supposed to have ruled in the mid-14th century, and to be the ancestor of the later kings of Bali. His historicity is, however, not clearly documented.

Arrival from Majapahit

According to a near-contemporary source, the poem Nagarakrtagama, Bali was subdued by the troops of Majapahit in 1343. In later Javanese and Balinese tradition, this conquest was retold in various versions. Babad Dalem, a chronicle from the 18th century, relates that Bali was in turmoil after the Majapahit invasion. In order to remedy this, the Patih (chief minister) Gajah Mada raised the Javanese nobleman Sri Aji Kresna Kepakisan as vassal ruler of Bali. Sri Aji Kresna Kepakisan was the grandson of a Brahmin but himself belonged to the Ksatria caste. His mother was a spiritual being, an apsara. His two elder brothers were vassal princes of Blambangan and Pasuruan on Java.
Sri Aji Kresna Kepakisan established his palace (puri) in Samprangan, in the Gianyar regency. With him went nine aristocrats from Java, who settled around the palace and assisted the ruler in his governance. Another grandee, Arya Gajah Para, settled at Tianyar on the north coast. However, the old population in the highland villages, the Bali Aga, violently resisted rule by the Javanese immigrants. Their recalcitrance almost drove the king back to Java. Hearing about the trouble besetting his vassal, Gajah Mada sent a magic dagger (keris), Ki Lobar, to Samprangan. With its help, Sri Aji Kresna Kepakisan overcame all resistance. At his death he was succeeded by his son Dalem Samprangan, but the princely residence was within short moved from Samprangan to Gelgel near the south coast.

Cultural and historical context

The story of the Majapahit conquest of Bali and the immigration of Javanese to the island has had an enormous impact on the self-image of the Balinese. Balinese cultural ideals are traced back to Javanese models, and Majapahit stands as a powerful symbol of civilization. The historical background of Sri Aji Kresna Kepakisan's reign on Bali is controversial. A copper inscription, supposedly dated 1471, mentions a Ratu Pakisan from Majapahit who appears to be the same figure. That would place him more than a century later than the Majapahit conquest, although the authenticity of the inscription remains to be verified. Also, his youngest son Dalem Ketut, who founded the Gelgel palace, is supposed to have survived the fall of Majapahit on Java (early 16th century). The oldest dated account that mentions the origin of the Balinese kings, a geographical text by the Portuguese Manuel Godinho de Erédia (c. 1600), asserts that these kings were descended from the rulers of Blambangan in East Java.

See also

 History of Bali
 Hinduism in Indonesia
 List of monarchs of Bali

References 

Monarchs of Bali
History of Bali
Balinese people
14th-century Indonesian people